Ordobrevia is a genus of riffle beetles in the family Elmidae. There are about 11 described species in Ordobrevia.

Species
These 11 species belong to the genus Ordobrevia:
 Ordobrevia amamiensis (Nomura, 1957)
 Ordobrevia communis Delève, 1968
 Ordobrevia constricta Delève, 1968
 Ordobrevia flavolineata Delève, 1973
 Ordobrevia fletcheri (Champion, 1923)
 Ordobrevia foveicollis (Schönfeldt, 1888)
 Ordobrevia gotoi Nomura, 1959
 Ordobrevia longicollis (Pic, 1923)
 Ordobrevia nubifer (Fall, 1901)
 Ordobrevia nubifera (Fall, 1901)
 Ordobrevia reflexicollis (Bollow, 1940)

References

Further reading

 
 
 
 
 

Elmidae
Articles created by Qbugbot